Maria de Fátima Coronel is a Cape Verdean lawyer and jurist who has been President of the Supreme Court of Justice since 2015.

Coronel served as a Magistrate, before becoming Attorney General and a Judge in criminal courts in Santa Catarina and Praia. She is not aligned with any political party and has been seen as an "exemplary" judge. She has been a Supreme Court judge since at least 2007.

Coronel was nominated President of the Supreme Court of Justice by President Jorge Carlos Fonseca in November 2015, and affirmed by her judicial colleagues, the first woman to take on the position.

See also
List of first women lawyers and judges in Africa

References

Living people
Women judges
Cape Verdean women
Cape Verdean lawyers
Women chief justices
Year of birth missing (living people)